Harold Irelan (August 5, 1890 – July 16, 1944) was a Major League Baseball player.

Irelan was born in Burnettsville, Indiana, and died in Carmel, Indiana.

External links
Baseball-Reference.com page

1890 births
1944 deaths
Baseball players from Indiana
Charlotte Hornets (baseball) players
Cleveland Indians scouts
Decatur Commodores players
Hopkinsville Hoppers players
Kingsport Indians players
Major League Baseball second basemen
Montreal Royals players
Minor league baseball managers
New London Planters players
Omaha Rourkes players
People from Carmel, Indiana
People from White County, Indiana
Philadelphia Phillies players
Rochester Hustlers players
Sacramento Sacts players